The first season of Românii au talent began on 18 February 2011 and ended on 25 April 2011. It was won by rapper Adrian Țuțu. The show was divided in 11 parts, the first six broadcast the auditions, the following four represented the semifinals, and the last part was the big final. The semifinals and the final were broadcast live, in a studio, with audience. The show recorded the biggest Romanian audiences for a reality competition.

Beginnings
The first commercials for the show were first aired in the Summer of 2010. The application process started on July 2, 2010. The judges firstly visited Constanţa, Piatra Neamț, Timișoara, Bucharest and Cluj-Napoca. The show first aired on 18 February 2011.

Success
The first episode was a big success for the ratings. Pro TV not only managed to have the biggest audience during the show, but managed to make "Romania's Got Talent" the most viewed television show since 2004 in Romania, beating its own records for the show Dansez pentru tine (Dancing with the Stars), another popular show in Romania broadcast by Pro TV.

Semi-finalists
Out of hundreds of contestants, only 200 won the local selection, having 1 or no X-es. The jury decided only 48 finalists. According to Pro TV's website, each contestant that qualified for the semifinals, were voted by the general public through text messages.

The semi-finals were broadcast in four editions: On April 1, April 2 respectively April 8 and April 9, 2011. In each edition, twelve contestants had to pass the juries and get as many votes from the general public in order to proceed further to the finals, the last step to the grand prize.

Semi-finals summary

The "Order" columns list the order of appearance each act made for every episode.

Semi-final 1 (1 April)
Guest performers: Costel Busuioc and Valentin Urse.

Semi-final 2 (2 April)
Guest performers: Pepe and Petruța Cecilia Kupper.

Semi-final 3 (8 April)
Guest performers: The 8 teams competing in Dansez pentru tine.

Semi-final 4 (9 April)
Guest performer: Horia Brenciu and Marius Mihalache.

Final (25 April)
Guest performer: Loredana Groza and Damian Drăghici.

Ratings

References

External links
 Romanii au talent at protv.ro

Românii au talent
2011 Romanian television seasons